Chota Nagpur may refer to
Chota Nagpur Plateau, in eastern India
Chota Nagpur Division, a division of British India
Chota Nagpur States, a collection of princely states of British India (historic)
 North Chotanagpur division, one of the five divisions in the Indian state of Jharkhand
 South Chotanagpur division, one of the five divisions in the Indian state of Jharkhand